Dharminder "Dhar" Mann (born May 29, 1984) is an American entrepreneur and film producer. He is best known for his video production company, Dhar Mann Studios, that creates short films for social media platforms such as YouTube. The films target a young audience and typically feature a turn of events that teaches the protagonist a moral lesson.

In 2010, Mann and stockbroker Derek Peterson founded the weGrow store that sold hydroponics marketed for growing medical marijuana. weGrow was closed two years later amid lawsuits between the business partners.

In 2013, Mann was convicted of defrauding the city of Oakland, California, through his real estate company MannEdge Properties.

Early life
Dharminder Mann was born on May 29, 1984, to Surinder Mann and Baljit Singh Mann, who emigrated from India to the United States. The Singh family owns Friendly Cab, a taxi cab operator based in Oakland, California. They have owned several local real estate companies since 1980, and more than 130 properties.

Mann recalls growing up in a one-bedroom Bay Area apartment that was shared with three other families. As his parents were focused on managing their company, rather than "give me their time, they gave me money to do things".

Early career and legal issues 
At the age of nineteen, Mann started a real estate company, and founded other, often failed, companies within the decade, including ventures in luxury car rental services and mortgage refinancing. Mann founded weGrow, a retailer of cannabis-growing hydroponics, with former stock broker Derek Peterson in January 2010. Mann and Peterson rented a supply store in Oakland, California, to sell hydroponics equipment, and aimed to open franchises in eight other states.

In early 2011, the weGrow store was closed, and Peterson filed lawsuits against the company, citing unpaid debts, and accused Mann of running a "hydroponzi scheme" in a Mother Jones interview. A spokesman for Mann subsequently accused Peterson of fabricating the allegations in retaliation for Mann's decision to downsize their partnership, and Mann successfully countersued Peterson for a cash settlement and stocks in Peterson's own company.

In 2012, Mann was charged with thirteen felony counts of fraud for allegedly defrauding a city beautification program while operating his real estate company MannEdge Properties in 2008 and 2009. Prosecutors reduced the charges to five felony counts in August 2013, and later that year Mann pled no contest to the five counts. He was sentenced to five years of probation and ordered to pay a $10,000 fine and restitution. Mann told The New York Times in 2021 that the conviction was later expunged.

Dhar Mann Studios 

In 2018, Mann founded a video production company named Dhar Mann Studios. The studio produces films for social media platforms such as YouTube. When Mann began publishing videos on YouTube in 2018, his output comprised motivational videos, and later shifted focus to morality plays. In 2021, Mann started a contract with the Creative Artists Agency and launched a mobile app where users can watch videos produced by his studio.

A New York Times profile of Mann described his YouTube videos as "timely narratives about police-calling Karens and Covid-19 hoarders" told in the fashion of "1980s after-school specials and the educational short films of the '50s", and noted their often "thin and absolutist" moral philosophy and blatantly clickbait titles. Vulture called them "feel-good" videos intended to "encourage people to be decent to one another."

As of February 2023, the channel has received 17.8 million subscribers and 10.27 billion views.

Workplace scandal and actors' protest 
In February 2023, multiple actors employed by Dhar Mann Studios went on social media to allege that they had poor working conditions and unsustainable pay. Many of the actors took to protesting outside of one of Mann's studio lots, with the protests happening abruptly. Actor Charles Laughlin revealed that many actors requested a meeting with Mann about their conditions, but were turned down. Laughlin also accused Mann of firing actress Jessica Ruth Bell after the meeting was requested. Both Laughlin and actor Colin Borden stated that actors who spoke out against the working conditions were immediately let go. Borden stated that many of the actors employed by Mann could not afford rent. After the protests, Mann issued a statement on his YouTube channel and Instagram account disputing the claims of the protesting actors and accusing them of "spreading false information" about his studio, family and himself. He stated how the studio operated and disclosed hourly rates for actors.

Personal life
In 2014, Mann was in a relationship with businesswoman Lilly Ghalichi, known for participating on the reality television series Shahs of Sunset. Mann met his fiancée Laura Avila in 2015. Together, the couple manage LiveGlam, a cosmetics company that Mann founded in 2015. The couple had their first child in 2020.

In late 2020, Mann purchased a mansion in Calabasas, California, previously owned by media personality Khloé Kardashian. Along with his family's real estate activities in Oakland, Mann and his brother Harmit also own property across the city.

References

External links
 
 

1984 births
Living people
21st-century American businesspeople
American businesspeople convicted of crimes
American businesspeople in the online media industry
American businesspeople
American cosmetics businesspeople
American entertainment industry businesspeople
American people of Indian descent
American real estate businesspeople
American YouTubers
Businesspeople from California
Businesspeople from Los Angeles
Place of birth missing (living people)